It's a Mad, Mad, Mad World (富貴逼人)  is a 1987 Hong Kong Chinese New Year film, directed by Clifton Ko. It starred Bill Tung and Lydia Sum as parents of the dysfunctional Piu family. The daughters were played by Elsie Chan, Loletta Lee and Pauline Kwan.

The comedy was very popular and the original cast of Tung, Shum, Chan, Lee and Kwan reappeared in its sequels It's a Mad, Mad, Mad World II (富貴再逼人) (1988), It's a Mad, Mad, Mad World III (富貴再三逼人) (1989) and It's a Mad, Mad, Mad World Too (富貴黃金屋) (1992). The plots of the films are all about the family becoming suddenly rich, usually through lotteries. The family also made a cameo appearance in The Banquet (1991).

Cast 
This is a partial list of cast.
 Bill Tung - Uncle Bill
 Lydia Sum - Aunty Lydia
 Eric Tsang - Smiley Joe
 Charine Chan Ka-Ling - Jody's teacher
 David Chiang - John
 Rachel Lee Lai-Chun - Loletta
 Pauline Kwan Pui-Lam - Jody
 Leung San - Miss Lui Mor
 Raymond Fung Sai-Hung - Mr Fung
 Cheng Siu-Ping - Auntie Nam
 Elsie Chan Yik-Si - May

Release
It's a Mad, Mad, Mad World was released in Hong Kong on January 28, 1987, marking of the Chinese New Year's Eve. It grossed a total of HK$27,141,624 on its initial release.

References

External links
 IMDb entry: It's a Mad, Mad, Mad World
 IMDb entry: It's a Mad, Mad, Mad World 2
 IMDb entry: It's a Mad, Mad, Mad World III
 IMDb entry: It's a Mad, Mad, Mad World Too

Hong Kong comedy films
1987 films
1987 comedy films
Chinese New Year films
Films directed by Clifton Ko
1980s Hong Kong films